Member list of Maroon 5, an American pop rock band from Los Angeles, California. The group originally formed in 1994 as Kara's Flowers with a line-up of Adam Levine, Jesse Carmichael, Mickey Madden and Ryan Dusick.

In 2001, guitarist James Valentine joined and the band changed the name to Maroon 5.

In 2006, Dusick departed the band and was replaced by Matt Flynn, originally a touring member from 2004 to 2006.

In 2010, PJ Morton auditioned to be a touring keyboardist and backing vocalist of Maroon 5 and joined the band. Morton became an official member when he filled-in for Jesse Carmichael (who took a temporary break from performing with the group to focus on his studies) from 2012 to 2014 and as Carmichael returned to the band in 2014. In 2016, multi-instrumentalist Sam Farrar, who had been touring with the band since 2012, was announced as an official member. Since then, Maroon 5 was formally a seven-piece band until the departure of bassist Mickey Madden.

Current

Former

Touring musicians

Timeline

Line-up history

References

 
Maroon 5